Sandro André da Silva (born March 5, 1974) is a former Brazilian football player.

Club statistics

References

External links

J. League

1974 births
Living people
Brazilian footballers
J1 League players
Kashima Antlers players
Royal Antwerp F.C. players
Sociedade Esportiva Palmeiras players
C.D. Guadalajara footballers
São José Esporte Clube players
Club Olimpia footballers
Avaí FC players
Brazilian expatriate footballers
Expatriate footballers in Japan
Expatriate footballers in Mexico
Expatriate footballers in Paraguay
Expatriate footballers in Belgium
Expatriate footballers in Venezuela
Expatriate footballers in Chile
Association football midfielders